Two Thousand Women is a 1944 British comedy-drama war film about a German internment camp in Occupied France which holds British women who have been resident in the country. Three RAF aircrewmen, whose bomber has been shot down, enter the camp and are hidden by the women from the Germans.

The film was released in the United States in 1951 in a severely cut-down version under the title of House of 1,000 Women. Per the British Film Institute database, this is the second in an "unofficial trilogy" by Launder and Gilliat, along with Millions Like Us (1943) and Waterloo Road (1945).

Plot
During the 1940 Battle of France, Rosemary Brown (Patricia Roc), an English novice nun, is apprehended by French soldiers who have mistaken her for a fifth columnist. She is sentenced to face a firing squad, but the Germans arrive and she is sent (without her habit, which is being cleaned) to an internment camp in a grand hotel at the spa town of Marneville. She journeys there in the back of a lorry with journalist Freda (Phyllis Calvert), stripper Bridie (Jean Kent), and posh Muriel (Flora Robson) and her travelling companion, Miss Meredith (Muriel Aked). At the camp, they meet Maud (Renée Houston), Margaret (Anne Crawford), Nellie (Dulcie Gray), Mrs Burtshaw (Thora Hird) and Teresa King (Betty Jardine). While two women are allocated to each room, Bridie uses her charms with Sergeant Hentzner (Carl Jaffe) to obtain a room to herself. Although the hotel is very luxurious, not all the baths have a water supply. The hotel proprietor, Monsieur Boper (Guy Le Feuvre), is believed to be collaborating with the Germans.

The women receive a radio from an unknown source, but it is swiftly confiscated by the Germans. The women conclude that they have a stool pigeon, nicknamed "Poison Ivy", amongst the dozen who knew about the radio. Nellie reports that she saw the German file on Rosemary; the charge of being a fifth columnist causes suspicion to fall on her. However, Freda and Maud do not believe it. They warn Rosemary, who reveals she is a nun.

Freda deliberately violates the blackout during a night-time air raid by the RAF. One plane crashes nearby after its crew bail out. Pilot Officer Jimmy Moore (James McKechnie), Sergeant Alec Harvey (Reginald Purdell) and Dave Kennedy (Robert Arden) seek refuge in the hotel. The women hide them, but have to conceal the fact from Teresa King, who is revealed to be a Nazi spy. Later, Alec recognises Rosemary as Mary Maugham, a singer whose boyfriend murdered his wife; she became a nun as a result. Jimmy and Rosemary begin to fall for each other, as do Dave and Bridie. Hentzner finds Dave, who manages to strangle him quietly, and his body is hidden.

The women devise a plan to enable the men to escape during a concert they will put on. To ensure the Germans stay until the end, Freda persuades Bridie to perform her act last. However, when Bridie overhears what Dave thinks of her (due to her fraternisation with the Germans), she slips Teresa a note betraying all. Freda makes Dave write an apology professing his love, which she delivers to Bridie. Bridie then goes to Teresa's room and sees that she has already read the note. The two women fight. Teresa wins and alerts Frau Holweg, but Maud knocks Holweg out. However, Teresa sees the airmen escaping and warns the commandant, but it is too late. The trio escape, with the aid of Monsieur Boper, who is not a collaborator after all. The women defiantly sing "There'll Always Be an England".

Cast

 Phyllis Calvert as Freda Thompson
 Flora Robson as Miss [Muriel] Manningford
 Patricia Roc as Rosemary Brown
 Renée Houston as Maud Wright
 Reginald Purdell as Alec Harvey
 Anne Crawford as Margaret Long
 Jean Kent as Bridie Johnson
 James McKechnie as Jimmy Moore
 Robert Arden as Dave Kennedy (as Rob Arden)
 Carl Jaffe as Sergeant Hentzner
 Muriel Aked as Miss [Claire] Meredith
 Kathleen Boutall as Mrs Hadfield
 Hilda Campbell-Russell as Mrs [Cornelia] Hope Latimer
 Christiana Forbes as Frau Holweg
 Thora Hird as Mrs. Burtshaw
 Dulcie Gray as Nellie Skinner
 Joan Ingram as Mrs Tatmarsh
 Betty Jardine as Teresa King
 Christiane De Maurin as Annette
 Guy Le Feuvre as Monsieur Boper (as Guy Lefeuvre)
 Paul Sheridan as French Officer

Production
Frank Launder stated later that he "should have treated the subject more seriously...that it would have been a bigger film if I concentrated less on the comedy and more on the drama".

Phyllis Calvert said she was offered the part of the nun who falls in love with a pilot, but turned it down and Patricia Roc played it instead. Calvert played Freda Thompson, even though she felt Launder and Gilliat "didn't like me turning down a part they had written for me, which I can understand". According to Calvert, Renée Houston and Flora Robson "didn't get on at all" while the film was being made.

Reception
According to trade papers, the film was a success at the British box office in 1944.

American release
Perhaps because of the success of Three Came Home, the film was released in the USA in 1951 in a severely cut version under the title of House of 1,000 Women. The American version of the film available on DVD ignores Patricia Roc's adventures as well as several subplots and starts the film with the transport to the internment hotel.

References

External links
 
 
 Review of film at Variety

1944 films
1944 war films
1940s war comedy-drama films
British World War II films
British black-and-white films
British war comedy-drama films
Films set in France
Gainsborough Pictures films
World War II films made in wartime
World War II prisoner of war films
1940s English-language films
1940s British films